North American area code 915 is a state of Texas area code for telephone numbers in the El Paso area. It is one of the original area codes established in October 1947. Originally, it covered the north-western part of the state, north of Austin and west of Fort Worth, and stretched from the Oklahoma border to the Mexican border.

This once-vast area code was split thrice, as follows:
In 1954, nearly the entire eastern portion (Lubbock and the South Plains) was combined with Fort Worth and the western portion of area code 214 in a flash cut as area code 817.
In 1957, most of the northwestern portion (the Texas Panhandle) was merged with the western portion of 817 to form area code 806.
In 2003, it was reduced to its current size in a three-way split with the western portion retaining area code 915, the eastern portion (Abilene, San Angelo, etc.) becoming 325, and the central portion (the Permian Basin) becoming 432.

Counties currently served by area code 915 are Culberson, El Paso, and Hudspeth.  It is the only area code in Texas that is predominantly in the Mountain Time Zone.

Towns and cities currently served by area code 915 include Anthony, Canutillo, Clint, Dell City, El Paso, Fabens, Fort Hancock, Horizon City, Salt Flat, San Elizario, Sierra Blanca, Socorro, Tornillo, and Van Horn.

Ten-digit dialing
Prior to October 2021, area code 915 had telephone numbers assigned for the central office code 988. In 2020, 988 was designated nationwide as a dialing code for the National Suicide Prevention Lifeline, which created a conflict for exchanges that permit seven-digit dialing. This area code was therefore scheduled to transition to ten-digit dialing by October 24, 2021.

See also
List of Texas area codes

References

External links

List of exchanges from AreaCodeDownload.com, 915 Area Code

915
915
El Paso, Texas
Telecommunications-related introductions in 1947